The women's water polo tournament at the 2015 Southeast Asian Games was held at the OCBC Aquatic Centre, Singapore from 10 to 15 June 2015. The competition was held in a round-robin format, where the top 3 teams at the end of the competition will win the gold, silver, and bronze medal respectively.

Squads

Results
All times are Singapore Standard Time (UTC+08:00)

Round-robin

Final standings

See also
Men's tournament

References

External links

Women
Southeast Asian Games
Women's sports competitions in Singapore